Green Land International Schools is a private international school and nursery located in Giza Governorate, Egypt.

It has a campus in Giza and a campus in Sheikh Zayed City, 6th of October City.

It is one of the two Egyptian schools authorized to teach the International Baccalaureate Primary, Middle and Diploma programmes, and is the only one in Egypt providing these programmes in both French and English. The school was founded in 1994 by a group of parents whose interest was to invest in their children's education and future. All the school's students study the International Baccalaureate. Green Land emphasises the teaching of the Arabic language to all its sections and grades.

Organisation

Campuses
The school's original campus is located in Geziret Mohamed road in Giza. It is located in Egyptian farmland; hence the name "Green Land." The nursery is located in the Mohandessin area. New campuses were built in Sheikh Zayed City near The Address and The Courtyard for both nursery and school, in 2011 and 2013, respectively.

Governance
The Green Land board governs the school, led by chairman Amr Moukhtar. The coordinators of the Primary Years Programme, the Middle Years Programme and the Diploma Programme report to the chairman.

Awards and recognition
In 2007, the school was awarded the Robert Blackburn Award for the best CAS project in Africa. The school's community service team raised funds to renovate a hospital in a nearby village and provide it with the equipment needed for it to run.

International Baccalaureate Diploma Program
Green Land Pré Vert became a full IB World School through the years 2003 to 2005, after being authorized to offer the Diploma Programme (DP).

The IB Diploma program of studies consists of courses taken in six groups (Language A, Language B, Individuals and Societies, Experimental Sciences, Mathematics, and the Arts). Courses are offered at the Higher Level (HL) and Standard Level (SL), for the diploma, a student must complete at least three at the higher level, but no more than four. Diploma candidates also complete a 4000-word thesis known as the extended essay, a course in philosophy called Theory of Knowledge, as well as participate in CAS (creativity, action, and service) activities. Students who fulfill all these requirements earn the International Baccalaureate Diploma.

In the last examination session, students at Green Land completed the following exams: Arabic A1 HL, Arabic A1 SL, Biology HL, Biology SL, Bus.& Man. SL, Chemistry HL, Chemistry SL, Economics HL, Economics SL, English B HL, Mathematics HL, Mathematics SL, Physics HL, Physics SL and Theory Knowl. TK.

References

External links

Green Land International Schools

 IBO Profile for Green Land Pré Vert International School and Nursery
School blog

Educational institutions established in 1994
International schools in Greater Cairo
Private schools in Egypt
International Baccalaureate schools in Egypt
1994 establishments in Egypt
Schools in 6th of October (city)
Schools in Giza